Lymphocyte antigen 6E is a protein that in humans is encoded by the LY6E gene. Increased expression of Ly6E is associated with poor survival outcome in multiple malignancies as determined by a survey of more than 130 published clinical studies of gene expression studies on cancer tissue samples and adjacent normal tissues. Ly6E is associated with drug resistance and tumor immune escape in breast cancer. Further research is required to validate Ly6E for translation research.

References

Further reading